Per Andreas Mattsson, (born 10 April 1967) is a Swedish singer perhaps best known as the lead singer of the band Popsicle.  He has also had a solo career. In 2021, he was one of the singers part of the twelfth season of Så mycket bättre which was broadcast on TV4.

Discography

Albums

References

1967 births
Living people
Swedish singers